

Portugal
 Angola – José Rodrigues Coelho do Amaral, Governor-General of Angola (1854–1860)

United Kingdom
 Malta Colony – William Reid, Governor of Malta (1851–1858)
New South Wales
 Lieutenant Colonel Charles FitzRoy, Governor of New South Wales (1846–1855)
 Sir William Denison, Governor of New South Wales (1855–1861)
 South Australia – Sir Richard Graves MacDonnell, Governor of South Australia (1855–1862)
 Van Diemen's Land/Tasmania
 Sir Henry Young, Governor of Tasmania (1855–1861)
 note:  Van Diemen's Land separated from New South Wales 1 May 1855 and was renamed Tasmania 24 October 1855
 Victoria
 Captain Charles Hotham, Governor of Victoria (1854–1855)
 note:  Victoria separated from New South Wales 22 May 1855.  Hotham was Lieutenant Governor of Victoria prior to that date, and remained as Governor until 31 December 1855.
 Western Australia
 Captain Charles Fitzgerald, Governor of Western Australia (1848–1855)
 Sir Arthur Kennedy, Governor of Western Australia (1855–1862)

Colonial governors
Colonial governors
1855